Mauesia bicornis is a species of beetle in the family Cerambycidae. It was described by Julio in 2003. It is known from Brazil.

References

Mauesiini
Beetles described in 2003